Christina "Pia" Gadd, (born 11 July 1945) is a Swedish journalist and author. She has been a journalist at Expressen newspaper in Gothenburg from 1981 to 1990, she has since been a freelance journalist, radio producer and author who has published several books.

Bibliography 
Att aldrig gå loss.  Interview with Clark Olofsson.Carlssons 1991
Mord, Blod, Moral. Carlssons 1994
En tillräckligt vacker dag för att dö.  Bonnier Alba 1994
Mat i myt och historia.  Carlssons 2001
Vett och etikett i affärslivet.  Ekerlids förlag 2002
Frillor, fruar och herrar – en okänd kvinnohistoria. Fischer & Co 2009
Domstolen. En nämndemans betraktelser. Dialogos 2017

References

1945 births
Living people
Swedish women writers
People from Gothenburg